The following is a timeline of the history of the city of Bangui, Central African Republic.

19th century

 1889 - French military post established at crossing of Mpoko River and Ubangi River.
 1891 - French military post relocated to present site of city.

20th century

 1904 - 1 July: Bangui becomes administrative seat of French colonial Ubangi-Shari.
 1906 - 11 December: Bangui becomes administrative seat of French colonial Ubangi-Shari-Chad.
 1912
 Jean Marchessou becomes mayor.(fr)
 1916 - Population: 4,003.
 1920 - Hôtel du Gouverneur built.
 1932 - Population: 16,903.
 1935 - Chamber of Commerce established.
 1937 - Cathédrale Notre-Dame built.
 1945 - Olympic Real de Bangui (football club) formed.
 1947 - City Hall and Ngaragba Central Prison built.
 1955
 Roman Catholic Archdiocese of Bangui established.
 1956
 Municipal election held; Barthélemy Boganda elected mayor.
 Population: 72,000.
 1958
  headquartered in city.
  active.
 1960 - City becomes part of independent Central African Republic.
 1963 - Bangui designated headquarters of the Organisation of African Unity.
 1964
 Bangui becomes a commune autonome.
 Population: 111,266.
 1966 - Boganda National Museum opens.
 1967 - Bangui M'Poko Airport begins operating.
 1969 - University of Bangui founded.
 1971
 Population: 187,000 (estimate).
 Across river from Bangui, town of Zongo founded in the Democratic Republic of the Congo.
 1977 - 4 December: Coronation of Bokassa I.
 1979
 April: Student protest; crackdown.
 September: Operation Caban.
 1981 - March: Post-election unrest.
 1984 - Population: 473,817 (estimate).
 1986 - E le Songo newspaper begins publication.
 1987 - DFC 8ème Arrondissement (football club) formed.
 1990 - National Société Centrafricaine de Télécommunications headquartered in city.
 1996 - May: Military mutiny occurs in Bangui.
 2000 
 begins broadcasting from Bangui.
Cécile Guéret becomes mayor.

21st century

 2003
 15 March: Bozizé stages governmental coup in Bangui.
 Population: 531,000.
 2005 - August: Flood.
 2006 - Barthélemy Boganda Stadium opens.
 2009 - March: "French troops reportedly deploy in Bangui after rebels infiltrate the capital."
 2010 - 15 January: Solar eclipse.
 2012 - Population: 750,000.
 2013
 23 March: "Séléka rebels overrun the capital and seize power" during the Central African Republic Civil War (2012–present).
 March–December: Violent unrest; many killed.
 Residents flee city; refugee camps develop around airport and elsewhere.
 June: Catherine Samba-Panza appointed mayor.
 2014
 February: Hyacinthe Wodobodé becomes mayor.
 May: European Union Force RCA "troops take charge of security at the airport in Bangui."
 28 May: Church of Fatima attacked.
 2015
 September: "Communal clashes break out in Bangui after Muslim taxi-driver attacked."
 November: Catholic pope visits city.
 2016
 May:  becomes mayor.
 October: Anti-UN protest; crackdown.
 December: Refugee camp at airport dismantled.
 2018 - 1 May: Attack occurs at Notre Dame de Fatima church.

See also
 Bangui history

References

This article incorporates information from the French Wikipedia and German Wikipedia.

Bibliography

in English
 
 

in French

External links

   (Bibliography of open access  articles)
  (Images, etc.)
  (Images, etc.)
  (Bibliography)
  (Bibliography)
  (Bibliography)

Images

History of Bangui
Bangui
Central African Republic history-related lists
Bangui